Khalid Oumar Timbo (born 27 April 1978) was a Mauritanian footballer.

International career
Timbo is a member of the Mauritania national football team and holds six caps.

Notes

1978 births
Living people
Mauritanian footballers
Mauritania international footballers
Mauritanian expatriate footballers
Mauritanian Muslims
Association football midfielders
FC Sens players
Expatriate footballers in France
ASA Issy players
US Avranches players
FC Drouais players
Mauritanian expatriate sportspeople in France

fi:Bilal Sidibé